Gerald Edward Beaumont is a retired Anglican bishop in Australia.

His first post was at St Andrew's Brighton, Victoria. He then served at West Geelong, Mooroolbark and Hawksburn. He was an assistant bishop in the Diocese of Perth, responsible for the Goldfields Country Region from 1998 until 2003. Afterwards he was vicar of St John's Camberwell, Victoria.

References

Australian College of Theology alumni
20th-century Anglican bishops in Australia
21st-century Anglican bishops in Australia
Anglican Diocese of Perth
Living people
Assistant bishops in the Anglican Diocese of Perth
Year of birth missing (living people)